Wilton Wendell Blancké (June 29, 1908 – 1971) was an American diplomat and author. He was the United States Ambassador to the Republic of the Congo (1960–1963), Central African Republic (1961), Chad (1961), and Gabon (1961) upon their independence, whilst resident at Brazzaville.

Biography
W. Wendell Blancké was born in Philadelphia, Pennsylvania, on June 29, 1908, to Wilton Wallace Blancké and Cecil Whittier (Trout) Blancké. He later joined the U.S. Foreign Service and became a U.S. Consul in Hanoi, North Vietnam, in 1950. On February 13, 1952, Blancké married Frances Elizabeth Nichol. In 1955, he was assigned o serve as counselor to US Ambassador Charles W. Yost in Laos. From 1957 to 1960, he was the U.S. Consul General in Frankfurt, West Germany.

On November 9, 1960, Blancké was nominated by President Eisenhower to be the United States Ambassador to the newly independent nation of the Republic of the Congo, then to the Central African Republic, Chad, and Gabon on December 12, 1960. He was eventually superseded in these posts by 1963, and in 1969 wrote The Foreign Service of the United States, and in 1971 wrote he wrote Juarez of Mexico. He was a resident of California, and died in 1971 at about 63 years old.

References

External links
 United States Department of State: Chiefs of Mission for Chad
 United States Department of State: Chad
 United States Embassy in N'Djamena

1908 births
1971 deaths
Ambassadors of the United States to the Republic of the Congo
Ambassadors of the United States to the Central African Republic
Ambassadors of the United States to Chad
Ambassadors of the United States to Gabon
United States Foreign Service personnel
20th-century American diplomats